This Earth Is Mine is a 1961 Argentine drama film directed by and starring Hugo del Carril. It was entered into the 2nd Moscow International Film Festival.

Cast
 Hugo del Carril as Laureano Cabral
 Mario Soffici as Anselmi
 Nelly Meden as Gina
 Ricardo Castro Ríos as Renato
 Gloria Ferrandiz
 Carlos Olivieri
 César Tiempo
 Raúl del Valle
 Benito Cibrián
 Félix Tortorelli
 Luis Quiles

References

External links
 

1961 films
1961 drama films
1960s Spanish-language films
Films directed by Hugo del Carril
Argentine drama films
1960s Argentine films